Fu Kun-chi (born 8 May 1962) is a Taiwanese politician. He was a member of the Legislative Yuan from 2002 to 2009, when he assumed the Hualien County magistracy. In September 2018, Fu was removed from the latter office, as the Supreme Court issued its final ruling on charges of insider trading against him, outstanding since 2005. Fu was re-elected to the Legislative Yuan in 2020. On 14 May 2020, he was convicted of illegal stock speculation and sentenced to two years and ten months in prison.

Education
Fu completed his bachelor's degree in transport administration and China research at Tamkang University. He then earned his master's degree in public administration from National Dong Hwa University.

Political career
Fu served in the Legislative Yuan from 2002 to 2009. Fu assumed the position of Magistrate of Hualien County starting 20 December 2009 after winning the 2009 Hualien County magistrate election on 5 December 2009 as an independent candidate. He was reelected again for the second term as magistrate after winning the 2014 Hualien County magistrate election on 29 November 2014 as an independent candidate.

2016 Mainland China visit
In September 2016, Fu with another seven magistrates and mayors from Taiwan visited Beijing, which were Hsu Yao-chang (Magistrate of Miaoli County), Chiu Ching-chun (Magistrate of Hsinchu County), Liu Cheng-ying (Magistrate of Lienchiang County), Yeh Hui-ching (Deputy Mayor of New Taipei City), Chen Chin-hu (Deputy Magistrate of Taitung County), Lin Ming-chen (Magistrate of Nantou County) and Wu Cherng-dean (Deputy Magistrate of Kinmen County). Their visit was aimed to reset and restart cross-strait relations after President Tsai Ing-wen took office on 20 May 2016. The eight local leaders reiterated their support of One-China policy under the 1992 consensus. They met with Taiwan Affairs Office Head Zhang Zhijun and Chairperson of the Chinese People's Political Consultative Conference Yu Zhengsheng.

2020 legislative election
Fu ran as an independent in the Hualien County Constituency he represented from 2002 to 2009, and defeated sitting legislator Hsiao Bi-khim in the 2020 legislative elections.

Controversy
In 2000, legal action began against investors of Taiwan Pineapple Group, regarding insider trading dating back to 1997. Subsequent investigations found that Fu was not involved in speculation of Taiwan Pineapple stocks, but did profit from stock manipulation of other companies. A 2013 Taiwan High Court ruling found Fu guilty, and he was to serve three years imprisonment. An appeal was heard by the same court in February 2019, and Fu's sentence was reduced to 34 months. Upon hearing the appeal in May 2020, the Supreme Court decided to uphold the High Court's 2019 ruling, without suspending Fu's civil rights, which permitted Fu to retain his seat in the Legislative Yuan.

In 2005, Fu was charged with insider trading dating back to 2003. The Taichung District Court ruled in 2008 that he was to pay a NT$50 million fine and sentenced to a prison term of 54 months. The case was appealed to the High Court, and Supreme Court, which returned the case to the High Court. A 2016 High Court decision held that Fu was guilty and reduced his sentence to eight months imprisonment. The Supreme Court refused another appeal in September 2018, and ruled that Fu must serve his eight-month sentence. Immediately after the court decision, the Ministry of the Interior removed Fu from the Hualien County magistracy. Fu's deputy Tsai Yun-huang was also removed from office, and the interior ministry selected Tsai Pi-chung to succeed Fu. Fu began serving his sentence on 25 September 2018. In March 2019, it was reported that Fu's sentence had been reduced by one month on good behavior, which granted him early release on 24 April 2019.

The Hualien District Prosecutors’ Office charged Fu with tax evasion in October 2017, regarding real estate sales.

On 24 June 2020, the Taiwan High Court extended Fu's prison sentence to a total of 46 months, in decisions regarding the stock manipulation cases against him, as well as his divorce from Hsu Chen-wei.

References

External links

 

1962 births
Living people
Magistrates of Hualien County
Tamkang University alumni
National Dong Hwa University alumni
Kuomintang Members of the Legislative Yuan in Taiwan
Expelled members of the Kuomintang
People First Party Members of the Legislative Yuan
Members of the 5th Legislative Yuan
Members of the 6th Legislative Yuan
Members of the 7th Legislative Yuan
Taiwanese politicians convicted of insider trading
Hualien County Members of the Legislative Yuan
Members of the 10th Legislative Yuan
Spouses of Taiwanese politicians